John Francis William Rogers (born April 15, 1956) is an American businessman, serving as Executive Vice President, Chief of Staff and Secretary to the Board of Goldman Sachs.

Early life
Rogers was born in Seneca Falls, New York on April 15, 1956 where his father owned a wholesale frozen foods business and his mother was a dental hygienist.  He is a graduate of the George Washington University.

Career
Rogers has held numerous posts in U.S. government including research assistant for President Gerald Ford's director of communications David Gergen, assistant to President Ronald Reagan (at twenty-seven, the youngest person to receive that responsibility), and when Reagan's chief of staff James Baker became Secretary of the Treasury, he took Rogers with him to the Treasury where Rogers was the Assistant Secretary of the Treasury from 1985 to 1987.  From 1991 to 1993, during George H. W. Bush's administration, he served as Under Secretary of State for Management. 

In 1994, Rogers joined Goldman Sachs in the Fixed Income Division and eventually became the chief of staff to CEOs Jon S. Corzine, Henry Paulson, Lloyd Blankfein, and David M. Solomon. He was made a partner in 2000, and "has no revenue-generating responsibilities and strives to have virtually no public profile." He is said to have been United States Treasury Secretary Paulson's closest advisor while at Goldman, as well as a member of United States Secretary of State James Baker's inner circle.

In 2011, CEO Lloyd Blankfein named Rogers one of the eleven executives of the firm. As of 2019, he was executive vice president, chief of staff and secretary to the board of directors at Goldman as well as serving as chairman of the board of directors of the Atlantic Council, the American Atlanticist international affairs think tank. Rogers is a life trustee and the treasurer of the Ronald Reagan Presidential Library. He also serves as Vice Chairman of the Board of the White House Historical Association, and Vice Chairman of the Board of the American Academy in Rome. In September 2019, Rogers was one of the US financial community representatives invited to the White House state dinner for Prime Minister of Australia Scott Morrison. In November 2019, he assisted 2020 Democratic Party presidential candidates to show that American small business was on their agenda.

In April 2020, Rogers hosted the inauguration of The Finance 202, a new lobbying group for small businesses. In 2020, he was appointed as the Chair of the Securities Industry and Financial Markets Association (SIFMA) Board of Directors for the year 2021.

Awards
In February 2020, Rogers was awarded the ICAA Arthur Ross Award in the patronage category.

Personal life
Rogers owns a home on Embassy Row in Washington, D.C. and is married to Deborah Lehr, with whom he has two children. Lehr, a journalist with Huffington Post, was a former senior negotiator in the Clinton Administration on China trade policy.  In 2018, Rogers and Lehr attended President Trump's state dinner with President Emmanuel Macron of France.

According to a 2006 profile in The New York Times, Rogers, who is interested in historic preservation, "does not welcome public scrutiny" and hates being photographed.  His friends "compare him to the George Smiley character in John le Carré's spy novels. Mr. Rogers, a slight, retiring man with a preference for tan raincoats, brings the kind of technical staff expertise and, his friends say, the ability to gravitate toward the seat of power in bureaucracies that recall Le Carré's spymaster."

References

1956 births
Goldman Sachs people
International Republican Institute
Living people
People associated with the American Museum of Natural History
George Washington University alumni
United States Under Secretaries of State